WGMG (102.1 FM) is a radio station broadcasting an Adult Contemporary format. Licensed to Crawford, Georgia, United States, with studios in Athens, Georgia.  The station is owned by Cox Media Group.  Its studios are located in Bogart, and its transmitter is located east of Athens.

Magic 102.1 was the flagship station for Southern Broadcasting Companies. The station was the home of The University of Georgia Lady Dogs Basketball. As of January 2008 WGMG along with sister stations WNGC, WPUP, WRFC, WGAU and WXKT (Washington, GA) were sold to Cox Media Group in Atlanta.

Programming
Notable weekday programming includes "Magic Mornings with Alichia" from 5am-10am, "Magic Middays" with Walker from 10am-2pm, Mookie from 2pm-7pm and nights with Natalie from 7pm-Midnight. Notable weekend programming includes "The Retro Pop Reunion" Saturday nights from 7pm-11pm.

History
In January 2008, it was announced that WGMG was sold (along with sister stations WNGC, WPUP, WRFC, and WGAU) to Cox Radio/Cox Media Group in Atlanta.

References

External links
Magic 102.1 WGMG official website

GMG
Mainstream adult contemporary radio stations in the United States
Cox Media Group
Radio stations established in 2008
2008 establishments in Georgia (U.S. state)